The men's tournament in ice hockey at the 2015 Canada Winter Games was held in Prince George, British Columbia between February 22 and March 1, 2015. Twelve provinces and territories competed in the tournament, with all but Nunavut participating.

Preliminary round
All times are local (UTC−8).

Key

Group A

Group B

Group C

Playoff round

Bracket

Fifth place bracket

Ninth place bracket

Qualifying round

9–12th place placement round

Quarterfinals

Eleventh place game

Ninth place game

5–8th place placement round

7th place game

5th place game

Semifinals

Bronze medal game

Gold medal game

Final ranking and statistics

Final ranking

Scoring leaders
List shows the top skaters sorted by points, then goals.

Source: HockeyCanada.ca

Leading goaltenders
Only the top five goaltenders, based on Goals Against Average, who played at least 120 minutes, are included in this list.

Source: HockeyCanada.ca

External links
Hockey Canada tournament website

Ice hocxkey